The Semyon Budyonnyy is a Valerian Kuybyshev-class (92-016, OL400) Soviet/Russian river cruise ship, cruising in the Volga basin. The ship was built by Slovenské Lodenice at their shipyard in Komárno, Czechoslovakia, and entered service in 1981. At 3,950 tonnes, Semyon Budyonnyy is one of the world's biggest river cruise ships. Her sister ships are Valerian Kuybyshev, Fyodor Shalyapin,  Feliks Dzerzhinskiy, Sergey Kuchkin, Mikhail Frunze, Mstislav Rostropovich, Aleksandr Suvorov and Georgiy Zhukov. Semyon Budyonnyy is currently owned and operated by Vodohod, a Russian river cruise line. Her home port is currently Nizhny Novgorod.

Features
The ship has two restaurants: Ladoga and Onega, two bars, solarium, sauna and resting area.

See also
 List of river cruise ships

References

External links

Project 92-016 

1981 ships
River cruise ships
Ships built in Czechoslovakia